Three strikes or 3 Strikes may refer to:
 Strikeout (or strike-out) in baseball or softball, when a batter receives three strikes during his time at bat, which leads to an "out"; a strikeout is a statistic recorded for both pitchers and batters
 Three strikes (policy), Internet disconnection for repeat offenders of copyright violations
 Three-strikes law, U.S. state laws for repeat offenders
 Three strikes (Revolutionary War), the three strikes necessary for the American Revolutionary War to start
 Turkey (bowling), in the sport of bowling, three consecutive strikes is known as a "turkey" or "triple"

Media 
 Three Strikes (TV series), a Comedy Central television series
 3 Strikes (film), a 2000 comedy film
 3 Strikes (The Price Is Right), a segment game from the American TV game show The Price Is Right
 "3 Strikes", a song by American band Terror Jr
 Trigger was referred to as "Three Strikes" in the later half of the campaign in Ace Combat 7: Skies Unknown

See also
 Third Strike (disambiguation)